"Techno Cumbia"  is a song recorded by American singer Selena for her fourth studio album, Amor Prohibido (1994). It was posthumously released as the b-side track to "Dreaming of You" through EMI Latin on August 14, 1995. Techno Cumbia would be put on her fifth and final studio album Dreaming of You (1995) and would be the fourth single for Dreaming Of You.  "Techno Cumbia" was written by Pete Astudillo and co-written and produced by Selena's brother-producer A.B. Quintanilla. The song is a dance-pop and tecnocumbia recording with influences of dancehall, rap, Latin dance, and club music. Lyrically, Selena calls on people to dance her new style the "techno cumbia" and calls out those who cannot dance.

"Techno Cumbia" garnered acclaim from music critics, who believed it to be one of the better recordings found on Amor Prohibido. Musicologists believed "Techno Cumbia" predated the Latin urban music market and found that Selena spearheaded a new style of music. The song posthumously peaked at number four on the United States Billboard Hot Latin Songs and Regional Mexican Airplay charts. The recording received the Tejano Music Award for Tejano Crossover Song of the Year in 1995 and received nominations for Single of the Year at the Broadcast Music Inc.'s pop awards and Music Video of the Year at the 1996 Tejano Music Awards.

Background and release 
"Techno Cumbia" was written by Selena y Los Dinos backup dancer and vocalist Pete Astudillo and Selena's brother A.B. Quintanilla who also arranged the piece and served as producer. In 2002, A.B. spoke on how Amor Prohibido (1994) was experimental and commented on how "Techno Cumbia" was an example of his ideas of keeping the band's image modern. During the recording sessions, Selena added rap verses to the song; A.B. believed it to be first of its kind for the genre. Selena was shot and killed by Yolanda Saldívar, her friend and former manager of the singer's Selena Etc. clothing boutiques, on March 31, 1995. The song was included on the track listing of the posthumously released album Dreaming of You (1995). A.B. flew to Manhattan to meet up with R&B group Full Force who remixed "Techno Cumbia" along with updating their remix version of Selena's 1992 song "Missing My Baby". San Antonio Express-News writer and Billboard Latin music correspondent, Ramiro Burr believed the addition of "Techno Cumbia" were "remastered, injecting extra percussions to spice them up." The album's remix version and radio edit of "Techno Cumbia" was released as the b-side track to the lead single "Dreaming of You".

Composition 

"Techno Cumbia" is a Spanish-language uptempo techno-pop cumbia song. It draws influences from Latin dance, dancehall, rap, and club music. Musicologists Ilan Stavans and Harold Augenbraum called it a hip-hop fusion song. Billboard magazine Latin music correspondent, John Lannert wrote the liner notes of Dreaming of You and called "Techno Cumbia" a "dancehall thumper". Musicologist James Perone found the recording to be the "richest track" off of Amor Prohibido because of its "rhythmic and textural contrast". Perone compared it to the '90s American dance music scene and commented on how the "techno aspect of the piece is muted; however, Selena's voice is electronically processed for part of the recording." "Techno Cumbia" incorporates "rhythmic shifts from accentuation on off-beats to accentuation on the beat". The "hey, ho" is a reference to American soul singer Ray Charles' call and response 1950s single "What'd I Say", used under a "Latin-style drumbeat".

Texas Monthly editor, Joe Nick Patoski believed "Techno Cumbia" contained the "most popular rhythm [at the time] coursing through the Latin music world". Patoski further wrote that the track "honored" it by "updating it with vocal samples, second line drumming from New Orleans, and horn charts inspired by soca from the Caribbean." This was echoed by word for word from author Deborah Paredez on her book on Selena's fandom. Patoski further wrote that the remix version "may have been laced with such exotica as a reggae toastmaster talking over a teeth-rattling bass line", and called it an "electronic mishmash", and a "pan-Caribbean attack that included soca and Hi Life from the Trinidad". Written in the key of G minor, the beat is set in common time and moves at a moderate 91 beats per minute. The remix version on Dreaming of You has a key signature set in C minor and moves at a moderate 90 bpm. The remix employs a piano, güira, tambourine, French horn and drums. Lyrically, Selena calls on people to dance her new style the "techno cumbia" dance and "humorously" calls out people who cannot dance cumbia. Italian essayists Gaetano Prampolini and Annamaria Pinazzi described the lyrics of "Techno Cumbia" that "summons everyone to the dance floor". Patoski found it to resemble the "nonsensical novelty" song by Shirley Ellis' 1964 single "The Name Game".

Critical reception and chart performance 
Because of its mixture of different cultural music genres, "Techno Cumbia" reminded authors Sara Misemer and Walter Clark of Chicano performance artist Guillermo Gómez-Peña's suggestion that "cultures are being superimposed". According to Ed Morales who wrote in his book The Latin Beat, "Techno Cumbia" is easily "forgettable throwaways" among the average listener, but found the recording "catchy" and "sticks in your gut". Author Michael Corcoran wrote in his music guide on Texan music that "Techno Cumbia" has "Michael Jackson-like trills". Patoski believed "Techno Cumbia" was aimed towards the Spanish international market, calling it "the most compelling tune". Author Norma Elia Cantú called "Techno Cumbia", "La Tracalera" (1990), and "La Carcacha" (1992) the "auditory of Tejano music". Morales believed the song "may have been an indirect influence on the fin de siècle collective of disc jockeys from the borderlands around Tijuana called Nortec". Stavans and Augenbraum called "Bidi Bidi Bom Bom", "No Me Queda Más", and "Techno Cumbia" to have been the "key hits of [Amor Prohibido]". Lannert wrote in the Dreaming of You liner notes that Selena "amazingly and quickly reverses field [from the previous track "Tú Sólo Tú"] to reveal a playful cooing growl".

"Techno Cumbia" debuted at number 13 on the United States Billboard Hot Latin Tracks chart on October 7, 1995. In its second week the song rose to number nine, receiving airplay honors that week. On October 21, 1995, "Techno Cumbia" jumped to number five and subsequently debuted at number seven on the U.S. Regional Mexican Airplay chart. The following week the recording gained more airplay spins at radios, however it remained at number five on the Hot Latin Tracks chart while the song moved to number six on the Regional Mexican Airplay chart. On November 4, 1995, "Techno Cumbia" reached its peak at number four on the Hot Latin Tracks chart. In the issue dated November 11, 1995, "Techno Cumbia" received increased airplay spins from the previous tracking week and peaked at number four on the Regional Mexican Airplay chart.

Cultural impact and legacy 
"Techno Cumbia" is believed by musicologist to have predated the Latin urban music genre—which became one of the most popular subgenres of Latin music in the 2000s decade—and to have spearheaded a new style of music. During a 2002 interview, Astudillo spoke on how the success of "Techno Cumbia" and its cultural impact on Latin music "has set a new trend". He further said that at the time of recording the song, he didn't envision the track to be as successful or impactful as it has been. Following Selena's death, A.B. formed his own group the Kumbia Kings and released "Boom Boom" from his album Shhh! (2001); believed by Billboard to be the direct "descendants of Techno Cumbia". Author Charles Tatum, found "Techno Cumbia" along with Selena's 1992 single "La Caracaha" and "Bidi Bidi Bom Bom" to have revolutionized the Tejano cumbia music scene. Music analyst Guadalupe San Miguel wrote that "Techno Cumbia", "Como la Flor" (1992), and "La Carcacha" were Selena's "biggest cumbia hits". Selena popularized the technocumbia genre during her career. Vibe magazine reported that Full Force was awarded gold and platinum discs for Selena's 1992 song "Missing My Baby" and "Techno Cumbia". The song was included on Selena's 2002 posthumous compilation Ones (album) 
 
The music video of "Techno Cumbia" was released posthumously and used the remix version found on Dreaming of You. The video was choreographed by Kenny Ortega, who later choreographed the music video of Selena's posthumously released "A Boy Like That" single in 1996. The music video featured live performances of Selena singing the song at the Houston Astrodome concert on February 26, 1995, outtakes from her music video for "Bidi Bidi Bom Bom", and performances of the singer during her tour for Amor Prohibido (1994–95). Cecilia Miniucchi served as the director of the video and found the project to be rather challenging to do. "Techno Cumbia" was awarded the Tejano Music Award for Tejano Crossover Song of the Year in 1995. During the awards ceremony, presenter Raul Yzaguirre mistakenly read the Tejano Crossover Song of the Year award as being Shelly Lares. The mistake was corrected during the awards "lengthy break" and Lares gave the award to Selena who was seen in tears and refused to accept the award from Lares, despite Jose Behar (president of EMI Latin) urging the singer to do so. The song was nominated for Music Video of the Year at the 1996 Tejano Music Awards, and Song of the Year at the 1997 Broadcast Music Inc.'s pop awards. Mexican group Liberación recorded the song for the tribute album Mexico Recuerda a Selena (2005). AllMusic's Alex Henderson commented on how Liberación gave "Techno Cumbia" a "grupero treatment". Mexican group Banda El Recodo performed and recorded the track for the live televised tribute concert Selena ¡VIVE! in April 2005."

Charts

Certifications

Credits and personnel
Credits adapted from Dreaming of You liner notes.

Selena – vocals
James Echavarria – vocals
Pete Astudillo – writer
Ricky Vela – keyboards
Joe Ojeda – keyboards

Chris Pérez – guitar
Suzette Quintanilla – drums
A.B. Quintanilla – co-writer, bass, arranger, producer, vocals
Art Meza – percussions

See also 

Latin music in the United States
1995 in Latin music

Notes

References

Sources 

 - Read online, registration required

External links 
Official Selena Website

1994 songs
1995 singles
Selena songs
Dancehall songs
Techno songs
Hip hop songs
Spanish-language songs
Songs written by A. B. Quintanilla
Songs written by Pete Astudillo
Song recordings produced by A. B. Quintanilla
EMI Latin singles